"Muchacha" is a song by Cuban reggaeton duo Gente de Zona and American singer Becky G. Written by Alexander Delgado, Daniel Joel Márquez Díaz, Randy Malcom, Alejandro Arce, Ángel Alberto Arce, Elena Rose, Paul Irizarry Suau, Juan Morelli, Yasmil Jesús Marrufo, Luis Eduardo Cedeno Konig, Roque Alberto Cedeno Konig, it was released by Sony Latin on April 23, 2020.

Critical reception

Charts

Weekly charts

Year-end charts

Certifications

References

2020 singles
2020 songs
Sony Music Latin singles
Gente de Zona songs
Becky G songs
Spanish-language songs
Songs written by Elena Rose